Myriotrema thailandicum is a species of lichen in the family Graphidaceae. Found in Thailand, it was formally described as a new species in 2002 by lichenologists Natsurang Homchantara and Brian J. Coppins. Here, on a trail close to the Phlio waterfall, it was found in a lowland rainforest, growing on both rocks and tree trunks. The lichen has a smooth and shiny, greenish-grey thallus with a dense cortex and a white medulla. It contains fumarprotocetraric acid, and sometimes has trace amounts of protocetraric acid.

References

thailandicum
Lichen species
Lichens described in 2002
Lichens of Thailand
Taxa named by Brian John Coppins
Taxa named by Natsurang Homchantara